Ben Mwanza (born 22 May 1984) is a retired Zambian football striker.

References

1984 births
Living people
Zambian footballers
Zambia international footballers
Roan United F.C. players
Konkola Blades F.C. players
Association football forwards